The 2018 Canadian Mixed Curling Championship was held from November 12 to 18, 2017 at the Swan River Curling Club in Swan River, Manitoba. The championship was won by the team from Ontario, who went on to represent Canada at the 2018 World Mixed Curling Championship.

Teams
The teams are listed as follows:

Round robin

Standings
Final round-robin standings

Scores

Draw 1
Sunday November 12, 7:00pm

Draw 2
Monday November 13, 2:30pm

Draw 3
Monday November 13, 7:00pm

Draw 4
Tuesday November 14, 10:00am

Draw 5
Tuesday November 14, 2:30pm

Draw 6
Tuesday November 14, 7:00pm

Draw 7
Wednesday November 15, 10:00am

Draw 8
Wednesday November 15, 2:30pm

Draw 9
Wednesday November 15, 7:00pm

Placement Round

Standings
Final round-robin standings

Scores

Draw 10
Thursday November 16, 10:00am

Draw 11
Thursday November 16, 2:30pm

Draw 12
Thursday November 16, 7:00pm

Draw 13
Friday November 17, 10:00am

Draw 14
Friday November 17, 2:30pm

Draw 15
Friday November 17, 7:00pm

Playoffs

Semifinals
Saturday, November 18, 10:00 am

Bronze medal game
Saturday, November 18, 3:00 pm

Final
Saturday, November 18, 3:00 pm

References

External links

2017 in Canadian curling
Canadian Mixed Curling Championship
Curling in Manitoba
Canadian Mixed Curling Championship
Canadian Mixed Curling